Laurent Clozel (born October 23, 1953 in Gap)  is a French mathematician. His mathematical work is in the area of automorphic forms, including major advances on the Langlands programme

Career and distinctions 

Clozel was a student at the École normale supérieure and later obtained a Ph.D. under Michel Duflo He is currently a full professor at the Université Paris-Sud in Orsay.

He received the Prix Élie Cartan of the French Academy for his work on base change for automorphic forms. He was an invited speaker at the 1986 International congress of mathematicians in Berkeley , talking about "Base change for GL(n)".

Together with Richard Taylor, Nicholas Shepherd-Barron and Michael Harris he proved the Sato–Tate conjecture.

Selected publications 
 
 Motifs et formes automorphes: applications du principe de fonctorialité In: 
 
 Appendix in : Jean-Pierre Labesse: Cohomologie, stabilisation et changement de base, Astérisque, Nr.257, 1999
 The Sato–Tate Conjecture, in Barry Mazur, Wilfried Schmid, Shing-Tung Yau u.a. (éditeur): Current Developments in Mathematics, American Mathematical Society, 2000
 Laurent Clozel et Luc Illusie, « Nécrologie : André Weil (1906–1998) », Gazette des mathématiciens, vol. 78, 1998,

Notes 

1953 births
Living people
École Normale Supérieure alumni
20th-century French mathematicians
21st-century French mathematicians